Garry Keith Edwards (born 6 September 1950) is a former Australian politician who represented the electoral district of Swansea in the New South Wales Legislative Assembly for the Liberal Party from 2011 to 2015.

Early career and background
A property conveyancer, Edwards was elected to Council for the City of Lake Macquarie in 2008 and serves as Deputy Mayor. He is an active member of the Belmont 16 ft Sailing Club and serves as Director of the Club. He is also a patron of Swansea Football Club.

Political career
Edwards won the previously very safe Labor seat from the incumbent member Robert Coombs at the 2011 state election following a previous attempt for the seat at the 2007 state election. Edwards was elected with a swing of 14.0 points and won the seat with 51.1 per cent of the two-party vote. Following his election, Edwards stated that he was yet to make a decision about whether he will continue to sit both on Council and as a member of parliament.

On 14 August 2014, Edwards stood aside from the parliamentary Liberal Party following the ICAC testimony of Newcastle mayor and property developer Jeff McCloy, who told the Commission he had donated $1,800 cash-in-hand to Edwards' campaign. It is illegal in New South Wales to receive political donations from property developers.

Edwards stood as an independent candidate for the seat Swansea at the 2015 state election. He received 14% of the primary vote and lost the seat to the Labor candidate Yasmin Catley.

References

 

Independent members of the Parliament of New South Wales
Liberal Party of Australia members of the Parliament of New South Wales
Members of the New South Wales Legislative Assembly
1950 births
Living people
Place of birth missing (living people)
21st-century Australian politicians